The Dr. Robert George Williams House is a historic house at the junction of Arkansas Highway 8 and Arkansas Highway 209 in Parkdale, Arkansas.  It was built in 1903 for Dr. Robert George Williams, a prominent medical doctor and businessman in Ashley County, and is one of the most elaborately decorated houses in Parkdale.  The house when built was a simple wood frame gable end house with a porch across the front.  It was extensively altered in 1917, giving it the Colonial Revival flair it has today, adding gabled dormers on three sides and a two-story portico supported by fluted columns to the front facade.

The house was listed on the National Register of Historic Places in 1984.

References

Houses on the National Register of Historic Places in Arkansas
Colonial Revival architecture in Arkansas
Houses completed in 1903
Houses in Ashley County, Arkansas
National Register of Historic Places in Ashley County, Arkansas
1903 establishments in Arkansas